Zini may refer to:
Zini, a lemur in the 2000 Disney animated film Dinosaur
 Zeyni, a village in Baqeran Rural District, Iran
 Zini (footballer), Angolan footballer
 Guo Yuan (Zini), courtesy name Zini, Chinese politician

See also